Dza, also called Jen, is an Adamawa language of Nigeria.

References

Languages of Nigeria
Bambukic languages